Vs. is a PlayStation video game developed by Polygon Magic and published by THQ in 1997. The game, a 3D fighter, features 20 polygonal, gang-based characters (designed by former Marvel Comics artist Kurtis Fujita) brawling in a two-dimensional environment. Players select different members of each gang to fight rival gangs on their respective turfs.

The title is a port and an American localized version of Fighters' Impact, which was released only on the Japanese PlayStation and in Japanese arcades. It retained the game engine, most of the play mechanics, and some animations and other elements, but introduced an entirely new lineup of characters, new arenas, and a soundtrack of licensed music. It was met with an underwhelming critical response, being said to offer little new over the recent top-tier games in the fighting genre, and dropped into obscurity.

Gameplay
Players select a game mode to play then select one of the sixteen initially available fighters based on American gang stereotypes. Each fighter represents one of four different street gangs. Four bosses become available for selection upon certain conditions being met. Twelve different arenas based on real-life locations are used for combat. Fighting styles used include karate, aikido and kung fu.

Characters
Streets
Mia
Vikram
Oleg
Slim Daddy

Hood
Ramos
Jalil
Thana
Paco

Campus
Harold
Kathleen
Leath
O'Doul

Beach
Kenny
Calucag
Mineo
Kara

Bosses
Eric O
Joel
Neige
Hendrickson

Development
The characters were designed by former Marvel Comics artist Kurtis Fujita. According to Fujita, "The main idea and theme of Vs. was to create a game which had characters that Americans could identify with, while still maintaining the visual flair of Japanese anime and manga." Some of the characters, such as Harold, were designed by Fujita on spec, before he knew of the street gang theme that THQ wanted for the game. The characters were animated using motion capture footage recorded at Polygon Magic's Tokyo studios.

The soundtrack includes music by Razed in Black, Los Infernos, Suicide Machines, and Pigs in Space.

Reception

Reviews for Vs. were mediocre, with most critics commenting that while the game is decent at worst in every respect, it fails to hold up against its contemporaries. GamePro, for example, summed up that "Vs. is an extremely competent game with the misfortune of stumbling into some bad timing. If it had been released, say, 18 months ago, it would've been the greatest thing since sliced bread and probably could've started its own religion. Unfortunately, Vs. offers nothing new to the already solid lineup of 32-bit 3D fighting games established by Tekken 2, Soul Blade, and Fighters Megamix." Common subjects of criticism were the unimaginative characters and the lack of variety in the moves. Reviewers for both Electronic Gaming Monthly and IGN also said the character models are too blocky, but GamePro considered them a highlight, stating that "The motion-captured characters are built well, if not a little blocky, and really move according to their unique fighting styles."

Most critics also found the frame rate impressively high, the evade move a strong feature, and the music both catchy and appropriate to the action. Sushi-X of Electronic Gaming Monthly said that "The music really saves much of the game for me", though he and co-reviewer Shawn Smith found the opponent A.I. absurdly difficult to the point where it takes the fun out of the single-player mode. IGN concluded that "Vs. is a decent start for a company looking to get into the fighting market, it's just not as accomplished as other fighters, even Tekken."

References

External links
Vs. related articles at IGN

1997 video games
3D fighting games
Organized crime video games
PlayStation (console) games
PlayStation (console)-only games
Polygon Magic games
THQ games
Fighting games
Video games developed in Japan